This is the Tamil discography of veteran Indian male playback singer K. J. Yesudas, who sang in over 700 songs in Tamil films. He Sang the most in Tamil. Yesuda's first film was in the film Bommai (1963) as Neeyum Bommai Naanum Bommai composed by S. Balachander.

He gave his voice to actors and thespians in the Tamil Film Industry such as M. G. Ramachandran, Sivaji Ganesan, R. Muthuraman, Gemini Ganesan, Jaishankar, Sivakumar, Ravichandran, Nagesh, Chandrababu, and A. V. M. Rajan. He also gave his voice to many new generation actors like Rajinikanth, Kamal Haasan, Vijayakanth, Vijayakumar, K. Bhagyaraj, Mohan, Karthik, Sathyaraj, Sudhakar, Prabhu, Pratap K. Pothen, Mammootty, Thiagarajan, Rahman, Rajesh, Sarathkumar, Murali, Nagarjuna, Arjun, Aravind Swamy, Ajith Kumar, Vikram, Vijay, and Jiiva in addition to various other known and unknown heroes and supporting actors like R. S. Manohar, Jai Ganesh, Thengai Srinivasan, Raghuvaran, Radha Ravi, Ramesh Aravind, Nizhalgal Ravi, Pandiyan, Sarath Babu, Sayaji Shinde, Vineeth, and Siva Chandran.

Early work
K. J. Yesudas sang in Tamil for Bommai first (Music. S. Balachander), but the first released movie was Konjum Kumari (1963) music by Vedha. Many M. G. Ramachandran movies released 1972, had one or two songs rendered by K. J. Yesudas. He had sung 19 songs for M. G. Ramachandran alone. His first song for the M. G. Ramachandran movie (actually second if we consider he lent his voice for Chandrababu in Parakkum Paavai) is "Thanga Thoniyile" from Ulagam Sutrum Valiban and his last song "Thendralil Aadum" from Madhuraiyai Meetta Sundharapandiyan. In Pallandu Vazhga movie M. G. R. use Yesudas instead T. M. Soundararajan, most songs by K. J. Yesudas.

Collaboration

Music composers
Major music directors worked with him S. Balachander, Vedha, M. S. Viswanathan, T. K. Ramamoorthy, Shankar–Ganesh, S. V. Ramanan, R. Govardhanam, G. Devarajan, V. Dakshinamoorthy, R. Parthasarathy, Salil Chowdhury, Vedpaul Sharma, M. B. Sreenivasan, V. Kumar, Vijaya Bhaskar, K. V. Mahadevan, G. K. Venkatesh, Ilaiyaraaja, S. Rajeswara Rao, Chandrabose, L. Vaidyanathan, Kunnakudi Vaidyanathan, Gangai Amaran, Shyam, S. D. Sekhar, Lakshmikanth Piyarilaal, Bappi Lahiri, Vijaya T. Rajendar, V. S. Narasimhan, Raveendran, K. Bhagyaraj, Maragadha Mani, Murari, S. P. Balasubrahmanyam, Adhithan, Manoj–Gyan, Gyan Varma, Manoj Saran, Deva, A. R. Rahman, M. M. Keeravani, S. A. Rajkumar, Vidyasagar, Karthik Raja, Yuvan Shankar Raja, Srikanth Deva, V. Thooyvan, Sabesh–Murali, Bhagavathi Srinivasan, Dhina, Ishaan Dev, Natarajan Sankaran, Bhavatharini, D. Imman, Anirudh Ravichandran, Soundaryan, Sirpy, Anand Shankar, Devendran, Sampath Siva, Devadevan, Johnson, Saivannan, Philip Jerry and Hamsalekha.

Playback singers
He has sung with other male singers such as M. S. Viswanathan, T. M. Soundararajan, Sirkazhi Govindarajan, Saibaba, S. P. Balasubrahmanyam, Ilaiyaraaja, Malaysia Vasudevan, P. Jayachandran, S. N. Surendar, Arunmozhi, Balesh, Kalyan, Vijay Yesudas, Ranjith, Yuvanshankar Raja, Murali and Dhina

He also sang duets with many female playback singers such as Soolamangalam Rajalakshmi, M. S. Rajeswari, P. Suseela, B. Vasantha, L. R. Eswari, S. Janaki, P. Madhuri, B. S. Sasirekha, T. K. Kala, Vani Jayaram, Swarnalatha, Jency Anthony, S. P. Sailaja, Uma Ramanan, Shoba Chandrasekhar, Manjula, G. K. Vidhya, K. S. Chithra, Sujatha Mohan, Minmini, Sadhana Sargam, Anuradha Sriram, Madhushree, Vanitha, Saindhavi, Rita, Asha Latha, Sujatha Radhakrishnan, and Sunatha.

He sang duets with singing actors such as Vanisri, Vijaya T. Rajendar and Shruthi Haasan.

Awards

Honours and Major Awards
 Honorary Doctorate by Annamalai University, Tamil Nadu in 1989
 Kalaimamani Award by Government of Tamil Nadu.

Tamil Nadu State Film Awards
State Film Awards 5 times for the Best Male Playback by the Government of Tamil Nadu.

List of Tamil film discography

1960s

1970s

1970

1971

1972

1973

1974

1975

1976

1977

1978

1979

1980s

1990s

2000s

2000

2001

2010s

2020s

See also
 Dr. K. J. Yesudas
 K. J. Yesudas discography
 Chembai discography

References

External links
 

Tamil
Discographies of Indian artists